United High School or UHS, is a public four-year high schoollocated at 1905 100th Street near Monmouth, Illinois, a city of Warren County, Illinois, in the Midwestern United States. UHS is part of United Community Unit School District 304, which also includes United Junior High School, United North Elementary School, and United West Elementary School. Despite the Alexis United misnomer sometimes used to describe the high school, the campus is actually located 2 miles east of Monmouth, IL, though the district's north campus and one of the elementary schools is located in Alexis, Illinois. The misnomer is due to the district office previously being located in Alexis, Illinois. It has since been moved to the high school campus. The school serves a mixed city fringe, village, and rural residential community on the outskirts of the city of Monmouth, in the villages of Alexis, Kirkwood, Little York, North Henderson, and the unincorporated communities of Cameron and Gerlaw. Much of the school district is within the Galesburg micropolitan statistical area. United High School was formed by the consolidation of Alexis High School and Monmouth Warren High School in 2004. In 2007 Monmouth Yorkwood High School deactivated and was annexed into United High School.

Athletics
United High School competes in the Lincoln Trail Conference and is a member school in the Illinois High School Association. Its mascot is the Red Storm. The school has 2 state championships on record in team athletics and activities, Boys Football in 2004. In 2010, their football team lost in the Quarterfinals to Lexington, the eventual State Runner-Up. In 2011, their girls softball team won the state championship, after having claimed 2 runner-up finishes and a third-place finish as well. Katie Bertelsen, the pitcher for that softball team, became the first athlete in United history to play a sport for a Division I school. She went on to play at Southern Illinois University-Carbondale.

References

External links
 United Senior High School
 United High School
 United Community Unit School District 304

Monmouth, Illinois
Schools in Warren County, Illinois
Education in Mercer County, Illinois
Education in Knox County, Illinois
Education in Henderson County, Illinois
Public high schools in Illinois